David Stephen Celermajer  (born 8 December 1961) is an Australian cardiologist and the Scandrett Professor of Cardiology at the University of Sydney.

Early life and education
Celermajer is the son of John and Tina Celermajer, both Polish Jews who survived the Holocaust. When he was eleven, Celermajer won a scholarship to Sydney Grammar School. He went on to win the World Universities Debating Championship. He graduated from the University of Sydney with a medical degree in 1983, and won a Rhodes Scholarship that same year. He has a PhD in children's heart disease from the University of London, which he received in 1993, and a higher-doctorate D.Sc. from the University of Sydney.

Career
In 2003, Celermajer was appointed the clinical director of the Heart Research Institute.

Research
In 1996, Celermajer published a study showing that exposure to secondhand smoke was associated with "dose-related impairment of endothelium-dependent dilatation" in the arteries of healthy young adults.

Honors and awards
In 2002, Celermajer was awarded the Commonwealth Health Minister's Award for Excellence in Health and Medical Research, and in 2006, he was elected a fellow of the Australian Academy of Science. In 2014, he was named an Officer of the Order of Australia for his "distinguished service to medicine in the field of cardiology, as a clinician and researcher, to improved medical diagnostic methods, and to the promotion of heart health, particularly in children and young adults.” In 2018 he was elected Fellow of the Australian Academy of Health and Medical Sciences.

Personal life
Celermajer describes himself as an atheist Jew. He is married to nurse Noirin Celermajer, whom he met at Royal Prince Alfred Hospital when they were both trainees there.

References

External links
Faculty page

1961 births
Living people
Australian cardiologists
Academic staff of the University of Sydney
Officers of the Order of Australia
Australian Rhodes Scholars
Sydney Medical School alumni
Alumni of the University of London
Fellows of the Australian Academy of Science
Fellows of the Australian Academy of Health and Medical Sciences
Australian Jews
Australian people of Polish-Jewish descent